Michael S. Gazzaniga (born December 12, 1939) is a professor of psychology at the University of California, Santa Barbara in the USA, where he heads the new SAGE Center for the Study of the Mind. He is one of the leading researchers in cognitive neuroscience, the study of the neural basis of mind. He is a member of the American Academy of Arts & Sciences, the Institute of Medicine, and the National Academy of Sciences.

Biography
In 1961, Gazzaniga graduated from Dartmouth College in the USA. In 1964, he received a Ph.D. in psychobiology from the California Institute of Technology, where he worked under the guidance of Roger Sperry, with primary responsibility for initiating human split-brain research. In his subsequent work he has made important advances in our understanding of functional lateralization in the brain and how the cerebral hemispheres communicate with one another.

Gazzaniga's publication career includes books for a general audience such as The Social Brain, Mind Matters, Nature's Mind,  The Ethical Brain and Who's in Charge?. He is also the editor of The Cognitive Neurosciences book series published by the MIT Press, which features the work of nearly 200 scientists and is a sourcebook for the field. His latest monograph is entitled Who's in Charge?: Free Will and the Science of the Brain. It was published by HarperCollins in 2011.

Gazzaniga founded the Centers for Cognitive Neuroscience at the University of California, Davis and at Dartmouth College, the Neuroscience Institute, and the Journal of Cognitive Neuroscience, of which he is the Editor-in-Chief Emeritus. Gazzaniga was a member of U.S. President George W. Bush's Council on Bioethics.  He was also the Director of the Law and Neuroscience Project, a project to study the intersection of law and neuroscience.

In 2019, Trinity College Dublin awarded him with an honorary doctorate.

Cultural influence
Gazzaniga's work is mentioned in the novel Peace on Earth by Stanisław Lem. It is also mentioned in Chapter 8 of Homo Deus by Yuval Noah Harari

In 2010 a tribute volume to the work of Gazzaniga was published, containing contributions by Joseph LeDoux, Stephen Kosslyn, Steven Pinker and others.

Studies
Gazzaniga has led pioneering studies in learning and understanding split brained patients and how their brains work.  He has performed numerous studies and done large amounts of research on split brain patients to provide a higher quality understanding into the lives of those affected by this rare phenomenon. He has studied how people who have the two halves of the brain separated function in comparison to those who do not.  Gazzaniga has looked into what bodily functions are controlled by each half of the brain. He has looked at what split brained patients are able to do as a result of their condition such as the ability to draw two different objects with each hand, an ability that a person with a non split brain is unable to do. They study how those with split brain act emotionally and physically in comparison to those who do not have a split brain. Through Gazzaniga’s studies a much greater understanding of the split brain phenomenon has been brought to other physiologists as well as the general population of the world.

Patient W.J.
Patient W.J. was a World War II paratrooper who got hit in the head with a rifle butt, after which he started having seizures. Before his operation to try to fix the seizures, Gazzaniga tested his brain functions. This included presenting stimuli to the left and right visual fields and identifying objects in his hands that were out of view. He was able to perform these tasks perfectly and afterwards he had the surgery that split his corpus callosum and anterior commissure. After his surgery, he was brought in again for testing with Gazzaniga in which stimuli such as letters and light bursts were flashed to the left and right visual fields. The stimuli flashed to the right visual field were processed by the brain’s left hemisphere, which contains the language center, so he was able to press a button to indicate he saw the stimulus and could verbally report what he had seen. However, when the stimuli were flashed to the left visual field, and thus the right hemisphere, he would press the button, but could not verbally report having seen anything. When they modified the experiment to have him point to the stimulus that was presented to his left visual field and not have to verbally identify it, he was able to perform this task accurately.

Patient W.J.’s divided corpus callosum could also cause conflicts between the hemispheres. An example of this could be seen with his hands, where each hand was controlled by the opposite hemisphere, and there was no communication between the two. This would result in moments where one hand might reach out to open a car door while the other would try to stop that hand from opening the door.

Patient P.S.
Patient P.S. was a teenage boy in whom it was shown that language comprehension was possible in the right hemisphere. When the word “girlfriend” was flashed to his left visual field, and thus his right hemisphere, he could not verbally say the name of his “crush”, but he then spelled out the name “Liz” with Scrabble tiles. This suggested that even though verbal language was not possible in the right hemisphere, there was a form of language possible through gesturing and left hand movements.

Publications

See also
 Attentional shift
 Split-brain
 Left-brain interpreter
 Lateralization of brain function
 Brain asymmetry
 Laterality
 Bicameral mentality
 Society of Mind
 Dual consciousness
 Divided consciousness
 Lateralization of brain function
 Alien hand syndrome

References

External links

 University of California Santa Barbara faculty web page
 Michael Gazzaniga’s personal web page
 The Law and Neuroscience Project
 Sage Center for the Study of the Mind
 "The Effects of Crack" — an exchange between Gazzaniga and the conservative commentator William F. Buckley, Jr.
 Video of Gazzaniga demonstrating the effects of split brain surgery
 Video (and audio) of interview/discussion with Gazzaniga by Carl Zimmer on Bloggingheads.tv
 

1939 births
Living people
California Institute of Technology alumni
American cognitive neuroscientists
Dartmouth College alumni
University of California, Santa Barbara faculty
Dartmouth College faculty
Fellows of the American Academy of Arts and Sciences
Fellows of the Society of Experimental Psychologists
University of California, Davis faculty
Members of the National Academy of Medicine
Members of the United States National Academy of Sciences